The following outline is provided as an overview of and topical guide to Telangana:

Telangana – one of the 29 states in India, and is located in South India. Telangana acquired its identity as the Telugu-speaking region of the princely state of Hyderabad, ruled by the Nizam of Hyderabad, joining the Union of India in 1948.  In 1956, the Hyderabad state was dissolved as part of the linguistic reorganisation of states and Telangana was merged with former Andhra State to form Andhra Pradesh. Following a movement for separation

General reference

Names 
 Official name: Telangana
 Common name: Telangana
 Pronunciation:
 Native name =  తెలంగాణ تلنگانہ
 Originally known as :
 Nicknames
 Seed Bowl of India
 Adjectivals
 Telugites
 Demonyms
 Telugite
 Abbreviations and name codes
 ISO 3166-2 code:  IN-TG
 Vehicle registration code: TS

Rankings (amongst India's states) 

 by population: 12th
 by area (2011 census): 12th
 by crime rate (2015): 5th
 by gross domestic product (GDP): 10th
by Human Development Index (HDI): 
by life expectancy at birth: 
by literacy rate:

Geography of Telangana 

Geography of Telangana
 Telangana is: an Indian state
 Population of Telangana: 
 Area of Telangana:  
 Atlas of Telangana

Location of Telangana 
 Telangana is situated within the following regions:
 Northern Hemisphere
 Eastern Hemisphere
 Eurasia
 Asia
 South Asia
 Indian subcontinent
 India
 South India
 Time zone:  Indian Standard Time (UTC+05:30)

Environment of Telangana 

 Wildlife of Telangana
 Flora of Telangana
 Fauna of Telangana
 Birds of Telangana

Natural geographic features of Telangana

Protected areas of Telangana

Wildlife Sanctuaries 

 Eturnagaram Wildlife Sanctuary
 Kawal Wildlife Sanctuary
 Kinnerasani Wildlife Sanctuary
 Nagarjunsagar-Srisailam Tiger Reserve
 Papikonda Wildlife Sanctuary
 Pocharam Wildlife Sanctuary
 Shivaram Wildlife Sanctuary
 Pakhal Wildlife Sanctuary
 Pranahitha Wildlife Sanctuary

National Parks 

 Mahavir Harina Vanasthali National Park
 Mrugavani National Park
 Kasu Brahmananda Reddy National Park

Zoo Park 

 Nehru Zoological Park

Regions of Telangana

Ecoregions of Telangana

Administrative divisions of Telangana

Districts of Telangana 

 Districts of Telangana

Municipalities of Telangana 

Municipalities of Telangana

 Capital of Telangana: Capital of Telangana
 Cities of Telangana

Demography of Telangana 

Demographics of Telangana

Government and politics of Telangana 

Politics of Telangana

 Form of government: Indian state government (parliamentary system of representative democracy)
 Capital of Telangana: Capital of Telangana
 Telangana Rashtra Samithi
 AIMIM

Union government in Telangana 
 Rajya Sabha members from Telangana
 Telangana Pradesh Congress Committee

Branches of the government of Telangana 

Government of Telangana

Executive branch of the government of Telangana 

 Head of state: Governor of Telangana, 
 Head of government: Chief Minister of Telangana,

Legislative branch of the government of Telangana 

Telangana Legislative Assembly
 Constituencies of Telangana Legislative Assembly

Judicial branch of the government of Telangana

Law and order in Telangana 

 Law enforcement in Telangana
 Telangana Police

History of Telangana 

History of Telangana

History of Telangana, by period 

 Assaka
 Satavahana dynasty
 Ikshvaku
 Salankayana
 Vishnukundina
 Pallava dynasty
 Eastern Chalukyas
 Kakatiya dynasty
 Bahmani Sultanate
 Qutb Shahi dynasty
 Hyderabad State
 Telangana Rebellion
 Telangana movement
 Andhra Pradesh Reorganisation Act, 2014

Prehistoric Telangana

Ancient Telangana

Medieval Telangana

Colonial Telangana

Contemporary Telangana

History of Telangana, by region

History of Telangana, by subject

Culture of Telangana 

Culture of Telangana
 Architecture of Telangana
 Temples of Telangana
 Languages of Telangana
 Monuments in Telangana
 Monuments of National Importance in Telangana
 State Protected Monuments in Telangana
 World Heritage Sites in Telangana

The arts in Telangana 

 Cinema of Telangana
 Telugu cinema

 Nirmal toys and craft
 Pembarthi Metal Craft
 Cheriyal scroll painting

Cuisine of Telangana 

 Telangana cuisine
 Hyderabadi cuisine
Hyderabadi Biryani
Hyderabadi Haleem
Double ka meetha
Sakinalu

Festivals in Telangana 

 Ugadi
 Dasara
 Vinayaka Chathurthi
 Eid ul-Fitr
 Easter
 Bonalu
 Batukamma

People of Telangana 

 People from Telangana

Religion in Telangana 

Religion in Telangana
 Christianity in Telangana
 Hinduism in Telangana
 Temples of Telangana

Sports in Telangana 

 Football in Telangana
 Telangana Football Association
 Telangana State League
 Telangana football team
 Stadiums in Hyderabad

Symbols of Telangana 

Symbols of Telangana
 State animal: Spotted deer
 State bird: Pala pitta
 State flower: Tanged puvvu
 State seal: Seal of Telangana
 State song: Jaya Jaya He Telangana Janani Jayakethanam
 State tree: Jammi tree

Economy and infrastructure of Telangana 

Economy of Telangana
 Software industry in Telangana
 Tourism in Telangana
 Transport in Telangana
 Airports in Telangana
 Roads in Telangana
 State Highways in Telangana

Education in Telangana 

Education in Telangana
 Educational institutions in Telangana
 Institutions of higher education in Telangana

Health in Telangana 

Health in Telangana

See also 

 Outline of India

References

External links 

 Official Telangana Web site
 Telangana Magazine

Telangana
Telangana
 1